The Euroblast Festival is a heavy metal music festival taking place in Cologne, Germany since 2008. The festival was initiated by close friends John Giulio Sprich and Daniel Schneider.

Background 
The Euroblast Festival, alongside the UK-Tech-Fest, has become the most important festival of the Modern Progressive Metal scene. Due to its distinct musical alignment and the singularity of its concept, top-class bands from almost all continents are part of the line-up and visitors arrive from all over the world.  So far, musicians and spectators from 45 countries have taken part.

One important characteristic of the festival is its familiar atmosphere between musicians and audience. On all three festival days it is possible to participate in lively exchanges. Aside from the concerts, music workshops with band members are an integral part of the concept and, moreover, fairgrounds offer the chance for musicians to make contact with renowned companies of the scene. In addition, open jam sessions allow audience members to join musicians on stage which coins the interactive character of the festival. Numerous bands consider the Euroblast Festival to be the starting point of their careers. The festival promoters also organise tours for well-established bands with their Euroblast Label.

History 
Towards the end of 2007 long-time friends John Giulio Sprich and Daniel Schneider decided – since there had not been a festival of this kind – to create their very own platform for innovative bands of the modern Rock and Metal genre. The two founders could rely on their experience as drummers in various bands when it came to the organisation of the first Euroblast Festival.
As time passed, a committed team assembled around Sprich and Schneider and they also invited an increasing number of bands leading to a wide variety of musical styles on the following festivals. For instance, TesseracT, a non-famous and unsigned band at that time, played at the fourth holding of the festival in May 2009; it was their first concert outside Great Britain. Since music labels had started to notice the festival, several bands could sign record contracts in the course of their participation.

After the fifth issue of the festival in August 2009 it was determined to hold the festival in an annual rhythm from then on. In October 2010 the sixth holding took place in the Underground club in Cologne. When it came to the choice of bands, the organisers for the first time concentrated mainly on the innovative Djent movement, a recent form of progressive Rock and Metal.

Ever since the seventh issue of the festival in October 2011, which was the first one to last three day, the promoters have set up a yearly band contest in cooperation with the Internet platform got-djent.com. The winning band is then scheduled to play on the following  festival.

The eighth Euroblast holding took place in October 2012 and had been designed to last four days. The first two of which took place in the Cologne Underground and the remaining two in the Live Music Hall. After these four days, the bands Monuments, Vildhjarta, Jeff Loomis and Stealing Axion also went on a tour threw the whole of Europe organised by the festival promoters.

Ever since its ninth edition in 2013, the festival has been held in the Essigfabrik in Cologne. Amongst others, German band The Ocean and the Dutch group Textures had been confirmed as headliners. Furthermore, Swedish band Meshuggah had surprisingly also been announced as another headliner towards the end of July.

Shortly after the end of the ninth holding, however, the festival organisers announced that a new edition of the festival was hanging in the balance due to financial straits. It was vainly tried to receive monetary aids from the city of Cologne, the state of Rheinland-Pfalz or the European Union. Eventually, a crowdfunding campaign was initiated and provided the needed money for the Euroblast Festival in 2014. This edition then was so successful, it has decisively contributed to the globe-spanning popularity of the festival which helped to remove all obstacles for its future continuation.

In 2015 at Euroblast 11, top-class headliners such as Between the Buried and Me and Leprous were on stage alongside many great newcomers. Also the legendary Cynic, who had their last appearance there before their Break.

Headliner at Euroblast 12 in 2017 were Animals as Leaders, Born of Osiris, Veil of Maya and Ensalved. Because the unique band selection and loyalty of the fans worldwide and after the successful edition 13 in 2017 – with headliners like Devin Townsend, Textures and Twelve Food Ninja – the Euroblast is complete established as the most important Event in the Progressive Music Movement.

Some Bands at the 14th edition of the Euroblast Festival on 5–10 October 2018 Monuments, Vola, Humanity's Last Breath, Hypno5e, The dali Thundering Concept, Vildhjarta, Destiny Potato and Vitalism.

The 15th edition of the Euroblast, which took place from 27 to 29 September 2019, was again able to present  well-known bands from the scene. Headliners were for example  Between the Buried and Me, Voyager, The Hirsch Effekt and Uneven Structure. Interesting new discoveries like Azure, Sunless Dawn, Sleep Token and Votum gave their festival debut.

The date for the Euroblast Vol.16 has already been announced. It will take place from 1 to 3 October 2020.

External links 

Official website
Euroblast Festival on Facebook

2008 establishments in Germany
Heavy metal festivals in Germany
Music festivals established in 2008